Ice Melt is a studio album by Crumb, released on April 30, 2021.

Production 
The album was written over the course of two years, and was first demoed by Crumb frontwoman Lila Ramani in 2019. It was recorded at a Los Angeles studio and produced by Jonathan Rado of Foxygen. It was produced and released independently on the band's own label, Crumb Records.

Composition 
Ice Melt incorporates psychedelic pop, indie and jazz instrumentals.

The album features fluidity and water imagery. During recording, the band lowered a microphone protected by a condom into a bucket of water, so that they could produce an underwater sound effect.

Track listing

Personnel 

 Lila Ramani – guitar, vocals
 Jesse Brotter – bass, vocals
 Bri Aronow – synthesizers, keyboard, saxophone
 Jonathan Gilad – drums
 Jonathan Rado – production
 Joe LaPorta – mastering engineer
 Michael Harris – mixing, engineering

Release 
The album was released on April 30, 2021. Three songs from the album were released as singles, including "Trophy", "BNR", and "Balloon".

Reception 
The album has a score of 76 on Metacritic, indicating "Generally favorable" reviews. It received praise for layered instrumentals and strong vocals, with some critics also writing favorably about its atmospheric songwriting.

Nick Roseblade of Clash called it a "a delightful album filled with clever melodies and delicious vocals."

Alex Cabre of DIY gave the album a more negative review, saying it "struggles to reach the same bright heights as its predecessor." He criticized the album as lacking direction or momentum.

References 

2021 albums
Indie rock albums by American artists
Psychedelic rock albums by American artists